, formerly known as Sapientia University or , was a Christian private university in Amagasaki, Hyogo, Japan. The school was founded in 1962 as a junior college and became a four-year college in the following year. The name "St. Thomas University" was adopted in 2007. The university stopped enrolling new students in 2010 and, after its last remaining student graduated in 2014, announced its closure and revealed its intention to donate its facilities to the city of Amagasaki.

Sister Schools
University of Santo Tomas, España, Manila
Aquinas University of Legazpi, Rawis, Legazpi City

References

External links
 Official website

Educational institutions established in 1962
Catholic universities and colleges in Japan
Universities and colleges in Hyōgo Prefecture
Defunct private universities and colleges in Japan